Circus Fever is a 1925 American short silent comedy film directed by Robert F. McGowan. It was the 35th Our Gang short subject released.

Plot
As described in a review in a film magazine, Farina contacts "speckled fever," and, in order to escape school and get to the circus, Mickey, Mary, Jackie, and Joe fake having it with the aid of a paint brush. Their parents and the physician are not deceived and punishment follows in the form of castor oil. Then comes the crowning punishment when the classes at the school they evaded have been dismissed so the students can attend the circus.

Cast

The Gang
 Joe Cobb as Joe
 Jackie Condon as Jackie
 Mickey Daniels as Mickey
 Allen Hoskins as Farina
 Eugene Jackson as Pineapple
 Mary Kornman as Mary
 Pal the Dog as himself

Additional cast
 Johnny Downs as kid on bicycle
 David Durand as Mickey and Jackie's brother
 Helen Gilmore as Mickey and Jackie's mother
 Joseph Morrison as Dr. Royal Sorghum
 Charley Young as Dr. Pipp

References

External links

1925 films
1925 comedy films
1925 short films
American silent short films
American black-and-white films
Films directed by Robert F. McGowan
Hal Roach Studios short films
Our Gang films
1920s American films
Silent American comedy films
1920s English-language films